Albatross is the third studio album by Canadian rock  band Big Wreck. It is the band's first album since their  2001 release The Pleasure and the Greed, and the first without original members Dave Henning and Forrest Williams. The album was released on March 6, 2012.

In 2012, the album won the CASBY Award for "Favourite New Album". The album was nominated for Rock Album of the Year at the 2013 Juno Awards.

Chart performance
Albatross debuted at #5 on the Canadian Albums Chart. This is the highest position ever for any album by Big Wreck or Ian Thornley on that chart. The album also peaked at #25 on the Billboard Heatseekers chart.

Track listing

Personnel
Big Wreck
 Ian Thornley – vocals, lead guitar, keyboards
 Brian Doherty – rhythm guitar
 Paulo Neta – lead & rhythm guitar, backing vocals
 David McMillan – bass guitar
 Christopher Henry – drums, percussion

References

2012 albums
Big Wreck albums